Dominique Schaefer (born 7 January 1999) is an inactive Peruvian–American tennis player.

On the junior tour, Schaefer has a career-high junior ranking of 25, achieved in May 2016.

Playing for Peru Fed Cup team, Schaefer has a win–loss record of 7–5 in Fed Cup competition.

ITF Circuit finals

Doubles: 3 (3 runner–ups)

External links
 
 
 

1999 births
Living people
Peruvian female tennis players
American female tennis players
Sportspeople from Lima
Tennis people from California
Tennis players at the 2019 Pan American Games
Pan American Games competitors for Peru
21st-century American women